Kayser Mountain is a mountain in Hall Land, NW Greenland. Administratively it is part of the Northeast Greenland National Park. This peak was named after German geologist and paleontologist Emanuel Kayser.

Geography
Kayser Mountain is located at the eastern end of the Haug Range in northern Hall Land, at the southern limit of the Polaris Foreland. It rises 6 km to the southwest of the shore of the Newman Bay fjord.

Brachiopod fossils of genus Pentamerus dating back to the Lower Silurian have been found in this mountain.

See also
List of mountains in Greenland
Peary Land Group

Bibliography
Greenland geology and selected mineral occurrences - GEUS

References

Kayser